Sir Charles Knightley, 2nd Baronet (30 January 1781 – 30 August 1864) was a British Conservative politician.

Knightley was the son of Reverend Charles Knightley and Elizabeth née Boulton. In 1813, he married Selina Mary Hervey, daughter of Felton Lionel Hervey and Selina Mary née Elwill, and they had at least two children: Sophia Selina Knightley (died 1886), and Rainald Knightley, 1st Baron Knightley (1819–1895).

Knightley was first elected Conservative MP for South Northamptonshire at the 1835 general election and held the seat until 1852, when he did not seek re-election.

He was an excellent horseman and consummate trainer, using the Pytchley Hunt for jumping practice.

He succeeded to the Baronetcy of Fawsley in 1812 upon the death of his uncle, Sir John Knightley, 1st Baronet. Upon his own death in 1864, the title was inherited by his son, Rainald.

References

External links
 

Conservative Party (UK) MPs for English constituencies
Baronets in the Baronetage of the United Kingdom
UK MPs 1835–1837
UK MPs 1837–1841
UK MPs 1841–1847
UK MPs 1847–1852
1781 births
1864 deaths